Russell Goldsmith is an American attorney, businessman and banker. He served as the chairman and is the former chief executive officer of the City National Bank, which he retired in January 2022.

Early life
Goldsmith graduated from Harvard University and received a J.D. from the Harvard Law School. His father, Bram Goldsmith, was chairman emeritus of City National Bank and his mother, Elaine (Maltz) Goldsmith, is a philanthropist. His maternal grandfather, Benjamin N. Maltz (1901–1993), was a co-founder of City National Bank in 1954.

Career
Goldsmith started his career as an attorney at Irell & Manella. Later, he co-founded his own law firm, Sanders, Barnet & Goldsmith, which tackled entertainment litigations.

From 1983 to 1985, Goldsmith served as the chief operating officer of Lorimar Television, a film production company. From 1986 to 1994, he served as chairman and CEO of Republic Pictures, a formerly publicly traded company. Moreover, from 1990 to 1994, he served as vice chairman of the San Diego Padres, a baseball sports team.

Goldsmith has served on the board of directors of City National Bank since 1978. He has served as the chairman and CEO of City National Bank since October 1995. From 2008 to 2011, he served on the Federal Advisory Council of the Federal Reserve Bank of San Francisco; during that period of time, he also served as its vice president for two years. He is also chair of the Mid-Size Bank Coalition of America.

Goldsmith serves on the board of trustees of the Harvard-Westlake School in Los Angeles, the Bay Area Council and the Jewish Federation Council of Greater Los Angeles as well as on the board of governors of the Frederick S. Pardee RAND Graduate School. Additionally, he is a member of the Council on Foreign Relations, the California Commission for Jobs and Economic Growth and the Civic Alliance. He also serves on the board of directors of Wynn Las Vegas and the Financial Services Roundtable.

Political activity
Goldsmith hosted a fundraiser for Hillary Clinton's 2016 presidential campaign.

Personal life
Goldsmith is married to Karen Mack, a producer and writer and the daughter of Las Vegas real estate developer Jerome D. Mack (1920–1998). They have three children, including Brian Mack Goldsmith.

References

Living people
People from Beverly Hills, California
Harvard Law School alumni
California lawyers
American bankers
American chief executives of financial services companies
Federal Reserve Bank people
San Diego Padres executives
RAND Corporation people
Jewish American attorneys
Year of birth missing (living people)
Mack family (banking)
21st-century American Jews